The Gauliga Generalgouvernement  was the highest football league in Polish areas annexed by Nazi Germany after 1939, which were not incooperated into any of the Gaue, the so-called General Government (German:General Gouvernement). The name Gauliga is somewhat misleading in this case as the region was not part of the Gau system. The league existed from 1941 to 1945.

Overview
The Gauliga Generalgouvernement was as such introduced by the Nazi Sports Office in 1941, but never actually became a proper league. It existed as a championship round for the four district champions of the General Government only, the four districts being:
 Krakau (Kraków)
 Lublin
 Radom
 Warschau (Warsaw)

Polish clubs were not permitted to take part in the competition, only clubs from the German ethnic minority, which made up 2.3 percent of the overall population of Poland, or 741,000 people.

In the 1941–42 season, the four district champions played a one-game semifinal, with the winners reaching the final while the two losers played for third place. The winner of the final then went on to the German championship. Little is known about the following season but the modus remained the same for the 1943-44 edition, suggesting it may have also been the same in 1942–43. The imminent collapse of Nazi Germany in 1945 gravely affected all Gauligas and football in the region ceased in 1944. The 1944–45 season may not have been started at all.

Winners and runners-up of the league
The winners and runners-up of the league:

Other clubs:

 Luftwaffen SV Lublin (1943/44)
 Luftwaffen SV Radom (1941/42)
 Rembertów Warschau (1943/44)
 SS und Polizei Lublin (1941/42)
 In 1943, the SG Warschau took part in the German championship instead of Luftwaffen SV Adler Deblin.

Former Polish footballers
Wilhelm Góra

Aftermath
With the end of the Nazi era, the Gauligas ceased to exist. The General Government came under Soviet control. The region then became a part of Poland again.

References

Sources
 Die deutschen Gauligen 1933-45 - Heft 1-3  Tables of the Gauligas 1933–45, publisher: DSFS
 Kicker Almanach,  The yearbook on German football from Bundesliga to Oberliga, since 1937, published by the Kicker Sports Magazine

External links
  The Gauligas Das Deutsche Fussball Archiv 
 Germany - Championships 1902-1945 at RSSSF.com
 Where's My Country? Article on cross-border movements of football clubs, at RSSSF.com

Recurring sporting events established in 1941
1945 disestablishments in Poland
Gauliga
Defunct football competitions in Poland
1941 in Polish football
1942 in Polish football
1943 in Polish football
1944 in Polish football
Football in occupied Poland (1939–1945)
Recurring sporting events disestablished in 1945
1941 establishments in Poland
General Government
Sports leagues established in 1941
Sports leagues disestablished in 1945